The 1897 Add-Ran Christian football team represented Add-Ran Christian University—now known as Texas Christian University (TCU)—as an independent during the 1897 college football season.

Schedule

References

Add-Ran Christian
TCU Horned Frogs football seasons
Add-Ran Christian football